Ceratomia igualana is a moth of the  family Sphingidae. It is found from Mexico to Costa Rica. Only a small number has been caught and not much is known about the biology of this species.

The wingspan is 51–56 mm for males and about 65 mm for females.

References

Sources
 James P. Tuttle: The Hawkmoths of North America, A Natural History Study of the Sphingidae of the United States and Canada, The Wedge Entomological Research Foundation, Washington, DC 2007, .

Ceratomia
Moths described in 1932